"Yureru Omoi" is the 8th single by Zard and released 19 May 1993 under B-Gram Records label. The single debuted at #1 rank two weeks. It charted for 20 weeks and sold over 1,396,000 copies and became second highest-selling single in her career. When she died, it was elected as her second best song on the Oricon polls.

Track list
All songs are written by Izumi Sakai.

composer: Tetsurō Oda/arrangement: Masao Akashi
Just for you
composer: Seiichiro Kuribayashi/arrangement: Akashi and Daisuke Ikeda
 (original karaoke)
Just for you (original karaoke)

References

1993 singles
Zard songs
Songs written by Tetsurō Oda
Oricon Weekly number-one singles
1993 songs
Songs written by Izumi Sakai
Song recordings produced by Daiko Nagato